Saraqib SC, also known as Sarakeb, is a Syrian football club based in the town of Saraqib.

The team was founded in 1980 and now playing in 1st Division in Syrian liberated areas.

Stadium
Currently the team plays at the Sarakeb Stadium.

External links
Goalzz
Sarakeb Stadium
Squad

Football clubs in Syria
Association football clubs established in 1980
1980 establishments in Syria